Megistaspis is a genus of trilobites in the order Asaphida and family Asaphidae.

They lived in the Ordovician period (478-449 million years ago), from the Upper Tremadocian age until the Lower Llanvim age. These arthropods were a low-level epifauna, fast-moving and detritivore.

Distribution 
Ordovician of Australia, China, Colombia (Serranía de la Macarena, Meta), the Czech Republic, Iran, Norway, United States (Nevada); Arenig of Argentina, Bolivia, China, France, Norway, Sweden, United States (Montana); Dawan of China; Arenigian of Argentina.

Gallery

References

External links 
 Sepkoski, Jack Sepkoski's Online Genus Database – Trilobita

Asaphidae
Asaphida genera
Ordovician trilobites of Africa
Fezouata Formation fossils
Ordovician trilobites of Asia
Ordovician trilobites of Europe
Ordovician trilobites of North America
Ordovician United States
Ordovician trilobites of South America
Ordovician Argentina
Ordovician Bolivia
Ordovician Colombia
Cambrian first appearances
Silurian extinctions
Tremadocian
Fossil taxa described in 1956